Barrows is a community in the Canadian province of Manitoba.

Demographics 

History 
When the Red Deer Lumber Company built its sawmill on the south shore of Red Deer Lake, they also built a rail line that connected their sawmill to the Canadian Northern Railway line that ran from Swan River to Erwood.

A community was established at this junction, which was named Barrows after one of the company's founders: Fredrick G. Barrows.

References 

Designated places in Manitoba
Northern communities in Manitoba